The 1972 Cork Intermediate Hurling Championship was the 63rd staging of the Cork Intermediate Hurling Championship since its establishment by the Cork County Board in 1909. The draw for the opening round fixtures took place at the Cork Convention on 30 January 1972. The championship began on 16 April 1972 and ended on 15 October 1972.

On 15 October 1972, Mallow won the championship following a 4-10 to 1-09 defeat of Blackrock in the final. This was their second championship title overall and their first title since 1959.

Team changes

To Championship

Promoted from the Cork Junior Hurling Championship
 Bandon

Regraded from the Cork Senior Hurling Championship
Cloyne

Fielded their second team
Youghal

From Championship

Promoted to the Cork Senior Hurling Championship
 Nemo Rangers

Regraded to the varioud Divisional Junior Championships
Kanturk
Shamrocks
Tracton

Results

First round

Quarter-finals

Semi-finals

Final

References

Cork Intermediate Hurling Championship
Cork Intermediate Hurling Championship